Enzo Scorza (born 1 March 1988) is a Uruguayan footballer who currently plays as an attacking midfielder or forward for Iraklis in the Greek Football League.

Club career
He made his youth career on Danubio, where he also played in the first team from 2006 to 2008. In January 2009 he moved from Danubio to Central Español along with Gerardo Vonder Putten.

In October 2009 he moved to Italy to join Brindisi, where he played until the end of the season.

In July 2010, he signed with Seregno, which plays in Italian Serie D.

On 17 July 2012, he signed a new deal with Peruvian side Cienciano. On 4 February 2014 he signed for Greek Football League club Iraklis.

International career
Scorza was part of the Uruguay U-17 squad that participated in the 2005 South American Under-17 Football Championship where his country finish runner-up and as a result, qualified to the 2005 FIFA U-17 World Championship in Peru.

He was also part of the Uruguay U-20 squad that participated in the 2007 South American Youth Championship, but he was not called to the Youth World Cup.

On October 24, 2005 he was reserved by Jorge Fossati to play a friendly match with Uruguay's senior team against Mexico in Guadalajara. While he was called up, he was training with the Uruguay U-17 team.

Honours
Danubio
Uruguayan Primera División: 2006–07

References

External links

1988 births
Living people
People from Rivera Department
Uruguayan footballers
Uruguayan expatriate footballers
Association football forwards
Danubio F.C. players
Central Español players
Cienciano footballers
Iraklis Thessaloniki F.C. players
Peruvian Primera División players
Expatriate footballers in Greece
Expatriate footballers in Italy
Expatriate footballers in Peru